The Albert and Theresa Marx House is a historic house located in Cashton, Wisconsin. It was added to the National Register of Historic Places on August 16, 2007.

History
Perhaps the defining feature of the house is its open, two-story circular veranda and adjoining entrance porch, which wraps around the southeast corner of the house, dominating the front elevation. Two-story Ionic columns support the flat roof of the 9-foot wide veranda, while square posts support the decked entrance porch that extends variously from seven to thirteen feet from the house. The house was originally built for Albert Marx and his wife, Theresa Mashak Marx. Albert had originally moved to Cashton in 1894 and married Theresa in 1901.

References

Neoclassical architecture in Wisconsin
Houses completed in 1906
Houses in Monroe County, Wisconsin
Houses on the National Register of Historic Places in Wisconsin
Queen Anne architecture in Wisconsin
National Register of Historic Places in Monroe County, Wisconsin
1906 establishments in Wisconsin